Eda Ahi (born 1 February 1990 in Tallinn) is an Estonian poet, translator and diplomat.

She graduated from University of Tartu, where she received master's degree; specialty was Russian culture. After graduation, she worked as a diplomat in Ukraine.

Works
 2012 poetry collection Maskiball (Masquerade)
 2018 poetry collection Sadam (Port)
 2019 poetry collection Sõda ja rahutus (War and Disorder)

References

External links
 Eda Ahi at Estonian Writers' Online Dictionary

Living people
1990 births
Estonian women poets
Estonian translators
21st-century Estonian writers
21st-century Estonian poets
University of Tartu alumni
Writers from Tallinn